Oste Erceg (born 23 March 1947) is a Bosnian Serb painter from Novi Grad, Bosnia and Herzegovina.

Life
Erceg was born in Gornji Rakani, where he attended elementary and high school, graduating in 1966.  He started painting in 1967, while attending the College of Textile - Chemical School in Zagreb, from which he graduated in 1972.  Beginning in 1973, Erceg worked as an engineer in a textile industry.  In 1986, he enrolled in a painting course at the Academy of Arts in Belgrade, which he attended until 1990.

Work
Erceg is notable for producing all his work as fingerpainting.  His work focuses largely on his homeland of Gornji Rakani, and his memories of the war in Bosnia and Herzegovina.  His oeuvre comprises 300 works, of which 100 have been sold to collectors from Australia to the Americas.

Reception
In her book Slikano perom art historian Danka Damjanović describes Erceg as a painter who developed his talent and style in isolation from other artists, who paints with emotion and expression as a means of cleansing and self-realization.

Academician Enver Mandžić attributes Erceg's sense of color to his training as a textile dyeing engineer.  On Erceg's portraiture, Mandžić says "In every one of his portraits, we can discover those deep emotional traits that are immortalized in the spirit of artists and models."

Exhibitions
Solo exhibitions
 1994 Gallery Heritage Museum, Novi Grad
 1994 Museum "King Peter Mrkonjića" Mrkonjić Grad
 2000 Gallery Heritage Museum, Novi Grad
 2006 Bosnian Cultural Center, Tuzla
 2009 Gallery Prijedor, Prijedor
 2011 Gallery Prijedor, Prijedor
 2012 of the Assembly Hall, Kostajnica
 2015 Gallery Bihać, Bihać
 2015 Gallery of cultural center, Gradiska
 2016 Gallery Heritage Museum, Novi Grad
 2018 1st mutual exhibition of Oste Erceg and Sanja Kuliš Kostajnica

Group exhibitions

 1985 Gallery Heritage Museum, Novi Grad Art Salon Novi Grad
 1986 Gallery Heritage Museum, Novi Grad Art Salon Novi Grad
 1987 Gallery Heritage Museum, Novi Grad Art Salon Novi Grad
 1988 Gallery Heritage Museum, Novi Grad Art Salon Novi Grad
 1989 Gallery Heritage Museum, Novi Grad Art Salon Novi Grad
 2005 3rd Biennial art miniatures BiH Tuzla, Sarajevo, Mostar, Bihać, 
 2007 4th Biennial art miniatures BiH Tuzla, Brčko, Sarajevo, Bihać
 2009 5th Biennial art miniatures BiH Tuzla, Brčko, Sarajevo, Bihać 
 2011 6th Biennial art miniatures BiH Tuzla, Brčko, Sarajevo, Bihać
 2013 7th Biennial art miniatures BiH Tuzla
 2014 12th International biennial art miniatures Gornji Milanovac
 2014 5th International exhibition "Art in miniatures" Majdanpek, Beograd
 2015 8th Biennial art miniatures BiH Tuzla, Brčko, Sarajevo
 2015 2nd International exhibition "Moslavina miniatures" Popovaca, Knin, Petrinja
 2015 6th International exhibition "Art in miniatures" Majdanpek, Beograd
 2015 14th International Art Colony for children of the center "Duga" Bihać
 2015 13th International biennial art miniatures Gornji Milanovac
 2016 7th International exhibition "Art in miniatures" Majdanpek, Beograd
 2017 3rd International exhibition "Moslavina miniatures" Croatia
 2017 8th International exhibition "Art in miniatures" Majdanpek, Beograd, Petrovac na Mlavi
 2017 9th Biennial art miniatures BiH Tuzla
 2017 4th International exhibition "Moslavina miniatures" Croatia, Popovača
 2017 1st Art exhibition "Piralo" Kostajnica
 2018 5th International exhibition "Moslavina miniatures" Croatia, Popovača
 2019 10th International exhibition "Art in miniatures" MajdanArt Majdanpek, Srbija
 2019 1st Festival of art "ArtNovum" Novi Grad Republic of Srpska Novi Grad
 2019 10th Biennial art miniatures BiH Tuzla
 2019 6th International exhibition "Moslavina" Croatia, Popovača
 2023 10th Group paintings exhibition "10 godina s Vama" Ludvig dizajn Croatia, Zagreb

Awards 
 2018 5th International exhibition "Moslavina miniatures" Croatia - One of three equal awards.

Gallery

Personal
Erceg is married and lives in Novi Grad. He has two daughters and owns a jewelry shop in Kostajnica.

References

Further reading

Newspaper articles
 Oslobodjenje (12 March 2000, page 13) "Strange World Oste Erceg"
 Glas Srpski (12 April 2000, page 14) "Cross anxiety"
 Glas Srpski (7 April 2006, page 19) "Portraits painted with love"
 Oslobodjenje (15 June 2006, page 24) "Pictures Oste Erceg"
 Blic (13 January 2012, page 28) "Unusual artist Oste Erceg creates fingers"
 Glas Srpski (2 February 1994, page 9) "Exhibition of Oste Erceg"

External links

 Oste Erceg:"40 Years of painting just with fingers"
 Painting Exhibition in Prijedor
 Famous people - Novi Grad
 List of participants 3rd Biennial art miniatures BiH
 List of selected participants for 13th International Biennial art of miniatures in Gornji Milanovac
 Picture of Oste Erceg from Bosnia and Herzegovina
 First art colony "Piralo" Kostajnica 2017.
 Open paintings exhibition of Oste Erceg and Sanja Kuliš in Kostajnica
 6th International exhibition "Moslavina"
 List of authors to exhibit at the 10th BiH Miniature Art Biennale
 Handing out tributes on the Day of the municipality of Novi Grad
 List of authors 15. International biennial art miniatures Gornji Milanovac
 Oste Erceg in Group paintings exhibition in Zagreb

1947 births
Living people
People from Novi Grad, Bosnia and Herzegovina
Serbs of Bosnia and Herzegovina
Serbian artists